RTV Belle Amia is a TV station that broadcasts program around the territory of Niš and local areas. Media part of the company was established in the form of private radio station and was on air from 1993 since 2006 when TV Belle Amie started broadcasting.

RTV Belle Amie show 
Today, RTV Belle Amie in its regular TV schedule broadcasts following shows:
 Belle Amie afternoon
 Belle amie morning
 Between the lines
 At the end of the day
 In the meantime
 Infobiz
 And after the news
 NEWS
 Belle Amie sport
 Third halftime
 Period; On Saturdays
 Stethoscope
 Dolce Vita 
 Guests 
 Whole day
 Apostrophe
 Statement of the week
 Rebus
 Agro Garden
 Informative talk
 Rest your brain
 7th day

Partners 
In the scope of the TV station has been organized journalist redaction that edits daily newspaper People's newspaper.

External links 
 

Television stations in Serbia
Television channels and stations established in 1993